Théophile Poel (born 24 April 1951) is a former Belgian footballer who played as central defender.

Honours

Club 
Standard Liège

 Belgian First Division: 1981–82, 1982–83
 Belgian Cup: 1980–81 (winners), 1983-84 (runners-up)
 Belgian Super Cup: 1981, 1983
 Belgian League Cup: 1975
 European Cup Winners' Cup: 1981-82 (runners-up)
 Intertoto Cup Group Winners: 1980, 1982, 1984

References 

1951 births
Living people
Belgian footballers
Standard Liège players
Association football defenders